Schools SMA Negeri 1 Narmada, also known as Smansa, is a high school on the Indonesian island of Lombok just east of Mataram.

Facilities 
 Air-conditioned classrooms
 Mosque
 Principal's office
 Vice Principal's office
 Teacher's room
 Administration room
 The BP
 Space Cooperation
 Space Curriculum
 Library
 Biology lab
 Physics Laboratory
 Chemistry lab
 Computer lab
 Language laboratory
 Audio-Visual Room
 Auditorium
 Secretariat MPK / OSIS
 Secretariat Paskibra
 Secretariat PMR (UKS)
 Secretariat Rohis (Masjid)
 Joint Secretariat (extracurricular)
 Wall Climbing
 Field Sports (Basketball / Futsal and Volleyball)
 Diner
 Cooperative
 Toilet

Extracurricular 

In 2013 21 extracurricular groups operated:
 Religious Affairs
 Rohis / SRI
 Rokris / SRKP
 States
 Field of Nation and State
 Paskibra
 PMR
 KIR
 Nature Lovers (Palasi)
 Field Sports
 Futsal Club
 Basketball
 Badminton
 Table tennis
 Taekwondo
 Pencak Silat (Pesilat One)
 Field of Art and Craft
 Kitchen Theatre One (DTS)
 Traditional Dance (Tradasa)
 Modern Dance (B'Once)
 Choir (Suansa)

SRI 1 / Rohis One (Islamic Spiritual Section) 

Section Rohani Islam SMAN 1 Narmada is a religious organization that organizes religious activities such as Eid al-Adha, the Ascension, Maulid, Benediction, Zakat Fitrah, Social Services, Pesantren Kilat, routine assessment Tahsin and Tafsir. IMTAQ classes are available.

Activities such as Qu'ran Tutoring, Marawis, Nasyid, Tetris (Theatre Rohis), and Robo Cup (Rohis Boedoet Cup) are provided.

Protestant Christian spiritual section

SUANSA (Voice Kids One / Choir) 
The SMA Negeri 1 Narmada chorus was created in Boedoet on March 13, 1998. SUANSA is a pioneer of extracurricular activities at SMA Negeri 1 Narmada.

Paskibra (Forces flag raisers) 

Paskibra SMAN 1 Narmada was established on 22 September 2001. It is a pioneer of extracurricular activities at SMA Negeri 1 Narmada. Paskibra participates in commemorative ceremonies outside the school.

Rescue 2981 (PMR) 
Youth Red Cross or  activities are held at the school around the flag ceremony, memorial service and competition held by eksrakulikuler.

Palasi (Nature Lovers SMA 1) 
Palasi stands for "Nature Lover High School Students 1". Ekstrakuliler Palasi is one of the pioneers in SMAN 1 Narmada. Palasi was established on January 20, 2001.

Basketball  
This extracurricular activity started in 2001.

Futsal / Football (FC Boedoet) 
Football began at the school on 27 April 2009. The Boedoet Cup is now awarded every year.

B'ONCE Dancer (Modern Dance) 
B'once dancer introduces students to modern dance.

TRADASA (Traditional Dance Singles) 
TRADASA explores traditional Indonesian dance customs.

References 

Schools in Indonesia
Senior high schools in Indonesia
Lombok